Paul V. Cloyd (June 13, 1920 – December 28, 2005) was an American basketball player. Born in Madison, Wisconsin, he played college basketball for the University of Wisconsin. He was selected by the Washington Capitols in the 1947 BAA draft, but never played for the team.

Cloyd, a 6-foot-2, 180-pound guard-forward, began his professional career with the National Basketball League's Sheboygan Red Skins during the 1947–48 season, when he finished second on the team in scoring to the NBL rookie of the year and league first-team pick Mike Todorovich with 555 points in 60 games. In 1948–49, he scored 336 points in 56 games for Sheboygan, which finished with a 35–29 record and advanced to the NBL playoffs.

After the NBL merged with the Basketball Association of America on August 3, 1949, Cloyd played for the Baltimore Bullets and Waterloo Hawks in the NBA for seven games during the 1949–50 season.

In 1950–51, Cloyd became player-coach of the Kansas City Hi-Spots in the ill-fated National Professional Basketball League, an organization that dissolved after one season. He led the team in scoring with 243 points in 23 games, but he relinquished his coaching duties on December 4, 1950. He continued as a player, and the Hi-Spots finished with a 4–19 record, last in the four-team Western division. Kansas City, which played its games at the old Pla-Mor Arena, dropped out of the league before the season ended.

NBA career statistics

Regular season

References

External links

1920 births
2005 deaths
Amateur Athletic Union men's basketball players
American men's basketball players
Baltimore Bullets (1944–1954) players
Guards (basketball)
Sheboygan Red Skins players
Small forwards
Sportspeople from Madison, Wisconsin
University of Wisconsin–Madison alumni
Washington Capitols draft picks
Waterloo Hawks players